Pedal Steel Guitar Association is an organization dedicated to the pedal steel guitar.  It was established in November 1973 in New York City, and has published The Pedal Steel Newsletter 10 times per year since December 1973.

The organization also holds an annual conference. It is held in Darien, CT in November.

References

External links 
 
 History, by Bob Maickel
 Facebook page

String instrument organizations
Music organizations based in the United States
1973 establishments in New York City